Cherry Creek may refer to:

Australia
 Cherry Creek, Queensland, a locality in the Toowoomba Region

Canada
Cherry Creek (British Columbia), a creek
Cherry Creek, British Columbia, a designated place

United States
Cherry Creek (Arizona), a tributary of the Salt River
Cherry Creek (Colorado), a tributary of the South Platte River
Cherry Creek (South Dakota), a tributary of the Cheyenne River
Cherry Creek (Tuolumne River), a stream in California
Cherry Creek, Colorado, a census-designated place in Arapahoe County
Cherry Creek, Columbus, Ohio, a neighborhood
Cherry Creek, Denver, Colorado, a neighborhood
Cherry Creek, Idaho, an unincorporated community in Oneida County
Cherry Creek, Nevada, a historic community in White Pine County
Cherry Creek, New York (town), in Chautauqua County
Cherry Creek, New York (village), within the Town of Cherry Creek
Cherry Creek, South Dakota, an unincorporated community in Ziebach County
Cherry Creek Golf Links, a gold club in Riverhead, New York
Cherry Creek High School, Greenwood Village, Colorado
Cherry Creek Range, a line of mountains in Nevada
Cherry Creek Rockshelter, an archaeological site in Colorado
Cherry Creek School District, a school district in Arapahoe County, Colorado
Cherry Creek State Park, Colorado
Cherry Creek Township, Buffalo County, Nebraska

See also
Cherry Creek Campaign, 1890 conflict between Apaches and the United States Army
Cherry Valley Creek, a tributary of the Susquehanna River in New York, United States
Cherry Creek Ruins, part of the Sierra Ancha Cliff Dwellings, a series of Pre-Columbian Native American cliff-dwellings in Arizona